The 2006 Nicholls State Colonels football team represented Nicholls State University as a member of the Southland Conference during the 2006 NCAA Division I FCS football season. Led by third-year head Jay Thomas, the Colonels compiled an overall record of 4–7 with a mark of 2–4 in conference play, tying for fifth place in the Southland. Nicholls State played home games at John L. Guidry Stadium in Thibodaux, Louisiana.

Schedule

References

Nicholls State
Nicholls Colonels football seasons
Nicholls State Colonels football